Morsko  is a village in the administrative district of Gmina Włodowice, within Zawiercie County, Silesian Voivodeship, in southern Poland.

The village has a population of 270.

See also 
 Bąkowiec Castle

References

Morsko